Zaire Rezende (25 December 1931 – 31 May 2022) was a Brazilian politician.

Biography 
From 1991 until 2000, he served as a member of the Chamber of Deputies.

Rezende died of respiratory complications from COVID-19 at the age of 90 in Uberlândia.

References

1931 births
2022 deaths
Members of the Chamber of Deputies (Brazil) from Minas Gerais
Deaths from the COVID-19 pandemic in Minas Gerais
20th-century Brazilian politicians
People from Uberlândia